The India national cricket team toured the West Indies during the 1982–83 cricket season. They played five Test matches against the West Indian cricket team, with the West Indies winning the series 2–0.

Tour matches

Four-day: Jamaica v Indians

Four-day: Trinidad and Tobago v Indians

Test matches

1st Test

2nd Test

3rd Test

4th Test

5th Test

ODI matches

The West Indies won the series 2-1.

1st ODI

2nd ODI

3rd ODI

References

External links
 Tour home at ESPN Cricinfo
 India in West Indies, 1982-83 at ESPN Cricinfo archive
 

1983 in Indian cricket
1983 in West Indian cricket
Indian cricket tours of the West Indies
International cricket competitions from 1980–81 to 1985
West Indian cricket seasons from 1970–71 to 1999–2000